James Fagan (1800 – 1863) was an Irish Repeal Association politician and timber merchant.

He was a member of the Reform Club.

References

External links
 

UK MPs 1847–1852
Members of the Parliament of the United Kingdom for County Wexford constituencies (1801–1922)
Irish Repeal Association MPs
1800 births
1863 deaths